Breathing is the process that moves air in and out of the lungs or oxygen through other breathing organs.

Breathing may also refer to:
 One of two Greek diacritics:
 Rough breathing, which represents h
 Smooth breathing, which represents the absence of h
 Breathing, aeration of wine, as by use of a decanter
 Breathing, as a technique for meditation
 Anapanasati, Buddhist breathing meditation
 Pranayama, Yoga breathing meditation
 Breathing (lens), an effect in some photographic lenses
 Breathing (noise reduction), an unwanted audible artifact of some noise reduction systems
 Breathing (memorial sculpture), a 2008 memorial sculpture in London
 Breathing (film), a 2011 Austrian art-house film

Music
 Breathing (band), a Chinese rock music band
 "Breathing" (Kate Bush song), 1980
 "Breathing" (Lifehouse song), 2001
 "Breathing" (Bryan Rice song),  during the Dansk Melodi Grand Prix 2010
 "Breathing" (Jason Derulo song), 2011
 "Breathing" (Triptykon song), 2014
 "Breathing", a song by Anne-Marie from Therapy
 "Breathing", a song by Nightingale from their 2000 album I
 "Breathing", a song by Yellowcard from their 2003 album Ocean Avenue
 "Breathin", a 2018 song by Ariana Grande
 "Breathing", a 2017 "original motion picture soundtrack from a lost film" by Canadian synth-pop duo Electric Youth

See also
 Breath (disambiguation)
 Breathe (disambiguation)
 Exhale (disambiguation)